The Masub inscription is a Phoenician inscription found at Khirbet Ma'sub (also Masoub) near Al-Bassa/Betzet. The inscription is from 221 BC. It is also known as KAI 19.

It is considered to originate from Umm al-Amad, Lebanon, around 6km to the north, on the basis of the reference to the temple in the inscription. In Dunand and Duru's catalogue of Umm al Amad inscriptions, it is number iv.

Inscription
The inscription is given as:

{|
|+ 
|-
| (1) || ‘RPT KBRT MṢ’ ŠMŠ WṢ || The portico on the quarter? of the sunrise, and the nor-
|-
| (2) || PLY ’Š BN H’LM ML’K MLK || -th (side) of it, which the Elim, the envoys of Milk-
|-
| (3) || ‘ŠTRT W‘BDY B‘L ḤMN || ʿAshtart and her servants, the citizens of Ḥammon, (built)
|-
| (4) || L‘ŠTRT B’ŠRT ’L ḤMN || to ʿAshtart, in the ashērah,? to (the) god Ḥammon
|-
| (5) || BŠT 20 3 3 LPTLMYS ’DN || in the 50th? year of Ptolemy, lord|-
| (6) || MLKM H’DR P‘L N‘M BN PT || of kings, (the) noble, (the) beneficent, son of Pto-|-
| (7) || LMYS W’RSN’S ’LN ’[Ḥ] || -lemy and Arsinoë, the divine A[del]-|-
| (8) || YM ŠLŠ ḤMŠM ŠT L‘M [ṢR] || -phoi, (in the) three-(and)-fiftieth year of the people of [Tyre],|-
| (9) || KM’Š BN ’YT KL ’ḤRY || as also they built the re-|-
| (10) || M ’Š B’RṢ LKN LM L || -st which (is) in the land, to be to them for|-
| (11) || ‘LM || eternity.''
|}

Notes

References

1887 archaeological discoveries
Phoenician inscriptions
Archaeological artifacts
Near East and Middle East antiquities of the Louvre
Phoenician steles
KAI inscriptions